The  Philadelphia Eagles season was the franchise's 16th season in the National Football League (NFL). The Eagles repeated as Eastern Division champions and returned to the NFL Championship game, this time defeating the Chicago Cardinals to win their first NFL title.

Off season 
The Eagles travel to New York State to hold training camp at Saranac Lake High School Field in Saranac Lake, New York, in northern New York State near Lake Placid and in the Adirondack Park. As of 2014 the building where the Eagles stayed is still a local landmark and is located on Lake Street in Saranac Lake and it is still called the Eagles Nest.

NFL Draft 
The 1948 NFL draft was held on December 19, 1947, five days after the end of the regular season, and nine days before the championship game was played. The Eagles finished the 1947 season with an 8–4 record. Tied with the Chicago Bears and Pittsburgh Steelers they picked 7th, 8th or 9th normally in the 32 rounds that they had picks.

The Washington Redskins had a lottery bonus pick at number one and chose Harry Gilmer, Back out of the University of Alabama. In the first round, the Eagles selected Clyde Scott, a running back from the University of Arkansas.

The Eagles' 26th round pick, Lou Creekmur, did not make the team but ended up becoming a Hall of Fame player for the Detroit Lions.

Many of the draft picks made by NFL teams ended up playing for teams in the rival All-America Football Conference (AAFC).

Player selections 
The table shows the Eagles selections and what picks they had that were traded away and the team that ended up with that pick. It is possible the Eagles' pick ended up with this team via another team that the Eagles made a trade with.
Not shown are acquired picks that the Eagles traded away.

Regular season

Schedule

Game recaps

Week 1 
Sunday, September 14, 1948

Played at Comiskey Park in Chicago

Week 2 
Sunday, October 3, 1948

Played at Los Angeles Memorial Coliseum in Los Angeles, CA

Week 3 
Sunday, October 10, 1948

Played at Shibe Park in Philadelphia, Pennsylvania

Week 4 
Sunday, October 17, 1948

Played at Griffith Stadium in Washington, DC

Week 5 
Sunday, October 24, 1948

Played at Shibe Park in Philadelphia, Pennsylvania

Week 6 
Sunday, October 31, 1948

Played at Forbes Field in Pittsburgh, PA

Week 7 
Sunday, November 7, 1948

Played at Polo Grounds in New York, NY

Week 8 
Sunday, November 14, 1948

Played at Shibe Park in Philadelphia, Pennsylvania

For third time in the 1948 season, and the second time playing at Shibe Park, the Eagles win a game by the score of 45–0.

Week 9 
Sunday, November 21, 1948

Played at Shibe Park in Philadelphia, Pennsylvania

Week 10 
Sunday, November 28, 1948

Played at Shibe Park in Philadelphia, Pennsylvania

Week 11 
Sunday, December 5, 1948

Played at Fenway Park in Boston, MA

Week 12 
Sunday, December 12, 1948

Played at Shibe Park in Philadelphia, Pennsylvania

Standings

Playoffs

NFL Championship Game 

The NFL Championship game was played at Philadelphia's Shibe Park on December 19 during a blizzard. Thinking the game would not be played in the blizzard, Steve Van Buren remained home until Eagles coach Earle "Greasy" Neale called him and told him the game was still on. He had to catch 3 trolleys and walk 12 blocks in order to make the game on time.

The paid attendance for the game was 36,309 (28,864 actual), and it was scoreless until early in the fourth quarter. The Eagles recovered a fumble that set up Van Buren's five-yard touchdown at 1:05 into the fourth quarter. The Cardinals disputed that the ball or Van Buren had crossed the snow-covered goal line.

This was the Cardinals' last appearance in any NFL Championship game in the 20th century. There is said to be a curse on the football Cardinals that followed them from Chicago to St. Louis and on to Arizona.

Roster 
All time List of Philadelphia Eagles players in franchise history

 + After name means 1st team selection

Postseason

NFL Championship Game recap 
1948 NFL Championship Game

Sunday, December 19, 1948

Played at Shibe Park in Philadelphia, Pennsylvania. Weather: Snow, Blizzard conditions

Attendance: 36,309 (paid), 28,864 (actual)

Awards and honors 
 Tommy Thompson leads league in Passing TDs – 25
 Tommy Thompson leads league in Passer Rating- PHI 98.4
 Steve Van Buren leads league in Rushing Attempts – 201
 Steve Van Buren leads league in Rushing Yards – 945
 Steve Van Buren leads league in Rushing TDs – 10
 Cliff Patton Leads League in Field Goals Made – 8
 QB Tommy Thompson, LH Steve Van Buren, RG Bucko Kilroy, RT Al Wistert, RE Pete Pihos, and P Joe Muha are named to numerous All-Pro teams at season's end 

Pro Football Hall of Fame members
 Alex Wojciechowicz – 1968
 Steve Van Buren – 1965
 Pete Pihos – 1970
 Greasy Neale – 1969 as coach

References

External links 
 Eagles on Pro Football Reference
 Eagles on jt-sw.com

National Football League championship seasons
Philadelphia Eagles seasons
Philadelphia Eagles
Philadelphia